Redditch Library is a library in the centre of Redditch, United Kingdom. Constructed for £550, 000 (£3.3m adjusted for inflation) and opened on 24 January 1976, it is the town's main public library, having been purpose-built to replace the former building on Church Green. It is the second-largest library in Worcestershire and attracts up to 12, 500 visitors a month. It was renovated in 2009 for just over £1, 000, 000. It is currently in the public consultation phase of a project, led by Redditch Borough Council, to demolish the building and relocate the service to Redditch Town Hall.

References

Libraries in Worcestershire
Redditch